{{DISPLAYTITLE:NZR NC class}}

The NZR NC class was a class of two steam locomotives built by Baldwin Locomotive Works built for service on New Zealand's private Wellington and Manawatu Railway (WMR).  They did not acquire their NC classification until the publicly owned New Zealand Railways Department (NZR) purchased the WMR and its locomotive fleet.

The first member of the NC class was ordered in 1901 and entered service in May 1902 as WMR No. 5. Another locomotive built to a very similar design was ordered in 1904 and entered service that same year as WMR No. 18. When the locomotives passed into NZR ownership in 1908, they were considered to be similar enough to be classified together, and while they also bore strong similarities to the members of the N class, they were sufficiently different that a separate classification of NC was used. Their main distinguishing feature was a wider firebox. They were Vauclain compound locomotives.

The two engines served NZR for just over two decades. No. 18, now NC 462, was retired in September 1928, while No. 5, now NC 461, remained in service until March 1931.  Their final region of operation is believed to be the Wairarapa, and they are known to have worked the line from the Hutt Valley up the western slope of the Rimutaka Range to the western end of the Rimutaka Incline.  Together with OB 455 (ex-WMR No. 11) and UD 465 (ex-WMR No. 20), NC 461 was one of the last surviving locomotives of WMR heritage.  All three were withdrawn in March 1931.

External links
Photo of Nc loco on Trainweb 
Drawings of the Nc class locomotives from Derek Brown: WMR No. 5/NZR NC 461 and WMR No. 18/NZR NC 462

References

Bibliography 

 
 
 

Nc class
2-6-2 locomotives
Baldwin locomotives
Vauclain compound locomotives
Scrapped locomotives
Railway locomotives introduced in 1901
3 ft 6 in gauge locomotives of New Zealand